Parenchelyurus hyena, the hyena blenny, is a species of combtooth blenny found in the western Pacific ocean, around Papua New Guinea.

References

hyena
Fish described in 1953